Chapri is a hill station in Pabbi Tehsil of Nowshera District, Khyber Pakhtunkhwa province of Pakistan. Known locally as Sapara in Pashtoo and called Chapri in Urdu and English, it is one of the far-flung villages of the Nowshera District. The People of Chapri are a very straightforward people. Village Chapri is surrounded by big mountains. Other settlements, i.e. Dak Ismail Khel, Saleh Khana, Spin Khak, Jaroba, and Cherat Cantonment are neighbouring villages. Chapri is a small village with respect to population in the area. Village Chapri originated from Village Dak Ismail Khel. The people of Chapri are engaged in various businesses, public/private services, and jobs/services abroad.

History

British Period
During British rule Cherat & Chapri was important as a hill cantonment and sanitarium for British troops in what was then the Nowshera Tehsil of the Peshawar District of British India.

Cherat was first used as a sanitarium for troops in 1861 and was used during the hot weather as a health station for the British troops who were quartered in the hot and malarious valley of Peshawar. It was declared a cantonment in 1886. The cantonment commands a view of the whole of the Peshawar valley on one side, and on the other of a portion of the Khwarra valley in Peshawar District, and of Kohat District as far as the Indus.

Pre historical origin

People living here are migrants from D. I. Khel 170 years back. Initially in Shami Khel, most made a living by serving in Britain Military's cantonment services but dwelling followed completely some time in 1850.
and has a history belonging to Kohat Ismail Khel Baba buried in Kohat, the father of Ismail Khels.

Historical places at Chapri
Among the Historical places are the following:
 Cherat Pumping Station at Chapri Gate
 Peer Safar Hill Station
 Naki Kote Pumping Station at Chapri
 Jan Mohammad Shaheed
 Zalabadeen Kamar Waterfall
 Halwat Shaheed
 FC Post
 Chapri Police Choki
 Sulimani Ghaar, a part of (Kohe Suliman)
 Talab
 Beautiful Play Ground.

Islamic Dar-ul-Uloom Female
Omme Hakeem Islamic Dar-ul-Uloom for Female, and Iqra Roza Tul Atfal.

Islamic Dar-ul-Uloom
Aamir Khattak Islamic Dar-ul-Uloom.

Chapri Library 
Chapri Library.

Education
 Govt Primary School Chapri (boys)
 Govt Primary School Chapri (girls)
 Iqra Modal High School Chapri
 Iqra (Rozatul Atfal) School Chapri
 APSACS Cherat (Chapri).

Sports
The youth of Chapri are very active in every field of sports but unfortunately there are few facilities available for their use. However, cricket, football, and Gulli dande (push dande) are sports played in Chapri. The best players of cricket are Basant Group

References

Populated places in Nowshera District